Marcel Bénabou (29 June 1939, Meknes in Morocco) is a French writer and historian.

Biography 
Emeritus professor of Roman history at the Paris Diderot University, Marcel Bénabou's work focuses on ancient Rome, in particular North Africa during Antiquity and acculturation and romanisation processes at work in these provinces.

A member of the "Ouvroir de littérature potentielle" (or OuLiPo) since 1969, which he joined one year after his friend Georges Perec, the following year he became the definitively provisional secretary. Since 2003 he combines this function with that of provisionally definitive secretary.

His Oulipian works often focus on the genesis of literary work and autobiography.

He appears in the guise of the lawyer Hassan Ibn Abbou in the novel La Disparition by his friend Georges Perec.

Works

Some historical works 
 Suétone, les Césars et l'histoire, introduction à La vie des douze Césars, éd. Folio, Gallimard, Paris 1975, 7-30.
 La Résistance africaine à la romanisation, éditions François Maspero, Paris, 1976
 Tacfarinas, insurgé berbère contre Rome, Les Africains, VII, éd. Jeune Afrique, 1977, 293-313.
 Juba II, ou l'africanité vassale de Rome, Les Africains, IX, éd. Jeune Afrique, 1978, 143-165
 « Les Romains ont-ils conquis l'Afrique ? » Annales. Histoire, Sciences Sociales, 1978, v. 33, n° 1, pp. 83–88.
 with Micheline Legras-Wechsler and Peter Brunt, Conflits sociaux en République romaine, F. Maspero, 1979, 196 p.
 L'impero romano e le strutture economiche e sociali delle province, (éd. M. Crawford), Biblioteca di Athenaeum, 4, Roma, 1986.
 PVN préfacier ou une forme latérale de l’histoire, in Pierre Vidal-Naquet, un historien dans la cité, La Découverte, 1998, pp. 58–66.
 « Rome augustéenne : genèse d'un lyrisme urbain ? », Le Poète dans la Cité : de Platon à Shakespeare, Le Cri édition, 2003, pp. 56–63.

Some literary writings 
 Pourquoi je n'ai écrit aucun de mes livres, Hachette, collection Textes du XXe, Paris, 1986 (  1986)
 German translation: Warum ich keines meiner Bücher geschrieben habe, Frankfurter Verlagsanstalt, Francfort, 1990
 Italian translation: Perche non ho scritto nessuno dei miei libri, Theoria, Rome-Naples, 1991
 Spanish translation: Por qué no he escrito ninguno de mis libros, Anagrama, Barcelone, 1994
 English translation: Why I Have not Written Any of My Books, University of Nebraska Press, Lincoln, 1996 
 Swedish translation: Varför jag inte har skrivit nagon av mina böcker, Ramus 2007
 Presbytère et prolétaires, éditions du Limon, Cahiers Georges Perec, 3, 1989 (in collaboration with Georges Perec)
 Der Verschlag, édition Plasma, Berlin, 1991 
 Jette ce livre avant qu'il soit trop tard, Seghers, collection Mots, Paris, 1992
 English translation: Dump This Book While You Still Can, University of Nebraska Press, Lincoln, 2001
 Italian translation: Butta questo libro finché puoi, Aracne editrice, Roma, 2009
 Jacob, Ménahem et Mimoun. Une épopée familiale, Seuil, collection La librairie du XXe, 1995
 English translation: Jacob, Ménahem and Mimoun. A Family Epic, University of Nebraska Press, Lincoln, 1998 (National Jewish Book Award, 1998)
 German translation: Jacob, Menachem und Mimoun. Ein Familienepos, Berlin Verlag, 2004, by 
 Georges Perec, What a man !, introduction, notes and commentaries, 1996
 Destin d’un couteau, Les Guère Épais, VIII, 1, Édition Plurielle, 1998
 Un art simple et tout d'exécution (in collaboration with Jacques Jouet, Harry Mathews and Jacques Roubaud), Circé, 2001
 Résidence d'hiver, Le Verger, 2001
 Écrire sur Tamara, Presses Universitaires de France, 2002
 English translation: To write on Tamara ?, University of Nebraska Press, Lincoln, 2004
 789 néologismes de Jacques Lacan, Édition EPEL, 2002 (in collaboration with Yan Pelissier, Laurent Cornaz and Dominique de Liège
 L’appentis revisité, series "Monde à part", 2003
 De but en blanc, un monologue en polychromie véritable (in collaboration with the Oupeinpo), Bibliothèque Oupeinpienne, 16, 2009
 "Anthologie de l'Oulipo", Gallimard, 2009 (in collaboration with Paul Fournel)

Fascicules of the Bibliothèque Oulipienne 
 Un aphorisme peut en cacher un autre, BO n° 13
 Locutions introuvables, BO n° 25
 Alexandre au greffoir, BO n° 29
 Bris de mots, BO n° 40
 Rendre à Cézanne, BO n° 59
 L’Hannibal perdu, BO n° 87, 1997
 Altitude et profondeur, BO n° 103, 1999
 La mort mode d’emploi, BO n° 133,  2004
 Petit supplément au Cratyle, BO n° 136, 2005
 Miniature persane, BO n° 153, 2007
 Ethique simpliste, BO n° 169, 2008
 Premier mai unitaire BO n° 182, 2010
 Saturations, BO n° 184, 2010
 "Le Voyage disert", BO n° 212, 2012

Works in collaboration with the OULIPO 
 La littérature potentielle, Gallimard, 1973) 
 traduction italienne : La letteratura potenziale, éd. CLUEB, Bologna, 1985
 Atlas de littérature potentielle, Gallimard, 1981, 
 La Bibliothèque oulipienne, volumes 1, 2, 3,  éditions Seghers, 1990 
 Oulipiana, a cura di R. Campagnoli, Guida editori, Napoli 1994
 Affensprache, Spielmachinen und allgemeine Regelwerke, Édition Plasma, 1997
 La Bibliothèque oulipienne, volume 4, Le Castor astral, 1997 
 La Bibliothèque oulipienne, volume 5, Le Castor astral, 2000 
 Abrégé de littérature potentielle, Mille et une nuits, 2002
 Maudits, Mille et une nuits, 2003
 La Bibliothèque oulipienne, volume 6, Le Castor astral, 2003 
 Moments oulipiens, Le Castor astral, 2004		
 Oulipo, adpf, Ministère des affaires étrangères, 2005
 La Bibliothèque oulipienne, volume 7, Le Castor astral, 2008
 C'est un métier d'homme, Le Castor Astral, 2009
 La Bibliothèque oulipienne, volume 8, Le Castor astral, 2011
 Abécédaire provisoirement définitif, Larousse 2014
 Le Voyage d'hiver et ses suites, Seuil, 2014

Biography 
 Marcel Bénabou archiviste de l'infini, Christophe Reig & Alain Schaffner eds, Paris, Presses de la Sorbonne Nouvelle, 2015, 229 pages - .

References

External links 
 Marcel Bénabou on Oulipo.net

École Normale Supérieure alumni
French scholars of Roman history
20th-century French historians
20th-century French writers
20th-century male writers
21st-century French writers
Oulipo members
People from Meknes
1939 births
Living people